"Good-bye My Loneliness" is debut single by Zard and released 10 February 1991 under B-Gram Records label. The single debuted at #9 rank first week. It charted for 15 weeks and sold over 209,000 copies.

Track list
All songs are written by Izumi Sakai.
Good-bye My Loneliness
composer: Tetsurō Oda/arrangement: Masao Akashi

composer: Seiichiro Kuribayashi/arrangement: Zard and Hiroshi Terao
In 2008, it was released as the 44th single with collaborated chorus by Aya Kamiki and was used as the 22nd opening theme for Case Closed

References

1991 debut singles
Zard songs
Songs written by Izumi Sakai
Songs written by Tetsurō Oda
Song recordings produced by Daiko Nagato
1991 songs